Richard Benjamin Muldrew (January 12, 1919 – July 10, 1982) was an American politician. He served as a Republican member of the Florida House of Representatives from 1957 to 1959. He served on the Brevard County Commission from 1960 to 1970.

In 1966, Muldrew sought the nomination of the Florida Republican Party to run for Governor of Florida, but was defeated by Claude R. Kirk, Jr. In 1970, his former rival, Governor Kirk, appointed him a county circuit judge. He died on July 10, 1982.

See also 
 Florida gubernatorial election, 1966
 List of members of the Florida House of Representatives from Brevard County, Florida

References 

1919 births
1982 deaths
Florida lawyers
County commissioners in Florida
Republican Party members of the Florida House of Representatives
People from Melbourne, Florida
Politicians from Watertown, New York
20th-century American politicians
20th-century American lawyers